Schiraces is a genus of moths of the family Erebidae. The genus was described by Schaus in 1916. Both species are found in French Guiana.

Species
Schiraces mopsus Schaus, 1916
Schiraces mortua Schaus, 1916

References

Herminiinae